Artur Skowronek (born 22 May 1982) is a Polish football manager. He has managed teams such as Widzew Łódź and Wisła Kraków in the Ekstraklasa.

References

Living people
1982 births
Sportspeople from Bytom
Polish football managers
Pogoń Szczecin managers
Widzew Łódź managers
Polonia Bytom managers
GKS Katowice managers
Wigry Suwałki managers
Stal Mielec managers
Wisła Kraków managers
Zagłębie Sosnowiec managers
Olimpia Grudziądz managers
Ekstraklasa managers
I liga managers
II liga managers